Parliamentary elections were held in Cyprus on 27 May 2001. The result was a victory for AKEL, which won 20 of the 56 seats. Voter turnout was 91.8%.

Results

References

2001 in Cyprus
2000s in Cypriot politics
Cyprus
Legislative elections in Cyprus
May 2001 events in Europe